Eocarterus propagator is a species of ground beetle in the genus Eocarterus.

References

P
Beetles described in 1901